Jonas Björkman and Max Mirnyi were the defending champions, but lost in quarterfinals to Julien Benneteau and Richard Gasquet.

Bob Bryan and Mike Bryan won in the final 6–2, 6–1, against Julien Benneteau and Richard Gasquet.

Seeds
All seeds receive a bye into the second round.

Draw

Finals

Top half

Bottom half

External links
Draw

Doubles